Pigenia is a small village in the Nicosia District of Cyprus, southwest of Kato Pyrgos. The hamlet of Challeri (Χαλλερι) is a part of the municipality.

References

Communities in Nicosia District